Robert Seifert (born January 31, 1988 in Dresden) is a German short-track speed-skater.

Seifert competed at the 2010 Winter Olympics for Germany. In the 500 metres, he placed third in his round one heat, failing to advance. As a member of the German 5000 metre relay team, he finished 3rd in the semifinal and 2nd in the B Final, ending up 5th overall. In the 500 metres, he finished 18th overall.

As of 2013, Seifert's best performance at the World Championships came in 2011, when he won a silver medal as a member of the German 5000m relay team. His best individual performance at a World Championships was in 2012, when he came 4th in the 500 metres. He also won a silver medal as a member of the German relay team at the 2010 European Championships.

As of 2013, Seifert has two ISU Short Track Speed Skating World Cup victories, one as part of the relay team in 2010–11 at Dresden, and in the 500 metres at Nagoya in 2012–13. His top World Cup ranking is 5th, in the 500 metres in 2012–13.

World Cup Podiums

References

1988 births
Living people
German male short track speed skaters
Olympic short track speed skaters of Germany
Short track speed skaters at the 2010 Winter Olympics
Short track speed skaters at the 2014 Winter Olympics
World Short Track Speed Skating Championships medalists
Sportspeople from Dresden